The Venerable Ones is a 1962 Argentine film written and directed by Manuel Antín. It was entered into the 1963 Cannes Film Festival.

Cast 
 Lautaro Murúa	
 Fernanda Mistral		
 Walter Vidarte		
Sergio Renan		
 Maurice Jouvet		
 Raúl Parini		
 Beto Gianola

References

External links 

1962 films
1960s Spanish-language films
1962 drama films
Argentine black-and-white films
Films directed by Manuel Antín
Argentine drama films
1962 directorial debut films
1960s Argentine films